College Park High School may refer to:
College Park High School (Georgia)
College Park High School (Pleasant Hill, California)
The Woodlands College Park High School